Andrew Charles Stewart (22 April 19071 January 1979) was a British diplomat, Ambassador to Iceland and Libya. He was recalled by Ivor Lucas as "a congenial soul with an 'Indian' background and some Arab experience", and not generally "particularly zealous in the exercise of his official functions". However, "when duty called", according to Lucas, he "could be very effective."

Born in Hull, Charles Stewart was educated at Scarborough College and the Royal Military College, Sandhurst, and entered the British Indian Army in 1927. However, he transferred to the Indian Political Service in 1933, and in 1947 entered the Foreign Service. He was Consul to Oman from December 1945 to June 1947, and again from August 1947 to August 1948. He was Counsellor to Indonesia from 1950 to 1952, Counsellor to the Netherlands from 1952 to 1954, and British Minister to Korea from 1954 to 1956.  As Consul-General to Jerusalem from 1957 to 1959, he reported Palestinian indifference to the uniting of Iraq and Jordan as the Arab Federation:

Stewart was Ambassador to Iceland from 1959 to 1961, and Ambassador to Libya from 1962 to 1963. He was forced to retire in 1963, "the victim of a pernicious Treasury practice":

References

Ambassadors of the United Kingdom to Iceland
Ambassadors of the United Kingdom to Libya
Ambassadors of the United Kingdom to South Korea
1907 births
1979 deaths
20th-century British diplomats
Indian Political Service officers